Don Williams (born 16 August 1939) is  a former Australian rules footballer who played with Richmond in the Victorian Football League (VFL).

Notes

External links 
		

Living people
1939 births
Australian rules footballers from Victoria (Australia)
Richmond Football Club players